Under Giant Trees is a five-track EP by the Danish band Efterklang. It was released in limited and numbered editions of 4500 copies on CD and 1200 copies on white 12" vinyl records.

Track listing
 "Falling Horses" – 7:12
 "Himmelbjerget" – 7:36 (Danish for "heaven hill")
 "Hands Playing Butterfly" – 4:31
 "Towards The Bare Hill" – 3:10
 "Jojo" – 6:52

Efterklang albums
Number-one singles in Denmark
2007 EPs